Margitta Krüger is a retired East German slalom canoeist who competed in the mid-1960s. She won a silver medal in the mixed C-2 event at the 1963 ICF Canoe Slalom World Championships in Spittal.

References

East German female canoeists
Living people
Year of birth missing (living people)
Medalists at the ICF Canoe Slalom World Championships